Russell Rogers (born January 9, 1939) is an American former athletics competitor and coach.

Rogers, a specialist hurdler, won a bronze medal in the 400 meters hurdles at the 1963 Pan American Games in São Paulo, which he bettered with a silver in the same event at the 1967 Pan American Games in Winnipeg.

From 1978 to 1986, Rogers was the track and field coach of Fairleigh Dickinson University.

In 1988 he was sprint coach for the US Olympic track and field team in Seoul, which famously included Carl Lewis.

Between 1989 and 2006, Rogers coached athletics at Ohio State University. He earned Big Ten Conference Coach of the Year honors in 1992 and 1993 when he led Ohio State to consecutive Big Ten outdoor titles.

References

External links
Russ Rogers at World Athletics

1939 births
Living people
American male hurdlers
Pan American Games medalists in athletics (track and field)
Pan American Games silver medalists for the United States
Pan American Games bronze medalists for the United States
Medalists at the 1963 Pan American Games
Medalists at the 1967 Pan American Games
Athletes (track and field) at the 1963 Pan American Games
Athletes (track and field) at the 1967 Pan American Games
American track and field coaches
Ohio State Buckeyes track and field coaches
Fairleigh Dickinson Knights coaches